The 1991 Kremlin Cup was a men's tennis tournament played on indoor carpet courts. It was the 2nd edition of the Kremlin Cup, and was part of the World Series of the 1991 ATP Tour. It took place at the Olympic Stadium in Moscow, Russia, from 4 November through 10 November 1991. Fourth-seeded Andrei Cherkasov won the singles title.

Finals

Singles

 Andrei Cherkasov defeated  Jakob Hlasek, 7–6(7–2), 3–6, 7–6(7–5) 
 It was Cherkasov's 1st singles title of the year and the 2nd and last of his career.

Doubles

 Eric Jelen /  Carl-Uwe Steeb defeated  Andrei Cherkasov /  Alexander Volkov, 6–4, 7–6
 It was Jelen's 2nd title of the year, and his 5th overall. It was Steeb's 2nd title of the year, and his 3rd overall.

References

External links
 Official website
 ITF tournament edition details

Kremlin Cup
Kremlin Cup
Kremlin Cup
Kremlin Cup
Kremlin Cup
1991 in Russian tennis